Kalagan may refer to:
Kalagan, Azerbaijan
Kalagan, Iran
Kalagan people
Kalagan language

Language and nationality disambiguation pages